Elisabeth Wiedemann (8 April 1926 – 27 May 2015) was a German actress and best known for her role as Else Tetzlaff in Ein Herz und eine Seele.

Career
Starting out as a dancer and stage actress, Elisabeth Wiedemann became known to the nation as Else Tetzlaff in the German sitcom Ein Herz und eine Seele. After 21 episodes, Wiedemann moved on to other projects and declined to return to the show's revival in 1976. She later said that she put Else through all emotions possible and she wouldn't want to get tired of the character. The role was unsuccessfully recast with Helga Feddersen and the show was canceled after four new episodes.

Wiedemann moved away from comedy and took guest stints in crime shows like Derrick, The Old Fox und Tatort. In 1983, she starred in the two-part drama .

Two years later, in 1985, Wiedemann played a supporting role in the feature film Otto - Der Film, her first comedic project after the end of Ein Herz und eine Seele.

Wiedemann returned to her roots as a dancer and stage actress the following years, only making rare appearances in television. After an episode of Das Traumschiff in 1995 and a guest appearance in Mama ist unmöglich in 1997, Wiedemann was said to have retired from acting.

However, she made several appearances on stage afterwards and was seen in Stubbe – Von Fall zu Fall and Ritas Welt in 2003, in another Tatort in 2004, SOKO 5113 in 2008 and Notruf Hafenkante in 2007 and 2011.

Awards
In 1966, Elisabeth Wiedemann won the Goldene Kamera.

Filmography

References

External links

1926 births
2015 deaths
German television actresses
German stage actresses
20th-century German actresses
21st-century German actresses
German female dancers